Wrockwardine Wood and Trench is a civil parish in the district of Telford and Wrekin, Shropshire, England.  The parish contains four listed buildings that are recorded in the National Heritage List for England.  All the listed buildings are designated at Grade II, the lowest of the three grades, which is applied to "buildings of national importance and special interest".  The parish is a suburb of the town of Telford, and the listed buildings consist of a former steam mill, a church, a rectory, and public house.


Buildings

References

Citations

Sources

Lists of buildings and structures in Shropshire